Specters of Marx: The State of the Debt, the Work of Mourning and the New International is a 1993 book by the French philosopher Jacques Derrida. It was first presented as a series of lectures during "Whither Marxism?", a conference on the future of Marxism held at the University of California, Riverside in 1993. It is the source of the term hauntology.

Summary
The title Spectres of Marx is an allusion to Karl Marx and Friedrich Engels' statement at the beginning of The Communist Manifesto that a "spectre [is] haunting Europe." For Derrida, the spirit of Marx is even more relevant now since the fall of the Berlin Wall in 1989 and the demise of communism. With its death the spectre of communism begins to make visits on the Earth. Derrida seeks to do the work of inheriting from Marx, that is, not communism, but of the philosophy of responsibility, and of Marx's spirit of radical critique. Derrida first notes that, in the wake of the fall of communism, many in the west had become triumphalist, as is evidenced in the formation of a neoconservative grouping and the displacement of the left in third way political formations. At the intellectual level, it is apparent in Francis Fukuyama's proclamation of the end of ideology. Derrida commented on the reasons for that spectre of Marx:

Derrida went on, in his talks on this topic, to list 10 plagues of the capital or global system.  And then to an account of the claim the creation of a new grouping of activism, called the "New International".

Derrida's ten plagues are:

 Employment has undergone a change of kind, i.e. underemployment, and requires "another concept".
 Deportation of immigrants. Reinforcement of territories in a world of supposed freedom of movement.  As in, Fortress Europe and in the number of new walls and barriers being erected around the world, in effect multiplying the "fallen" Berlin Wall manifold.
 Economic war. Both between countries and between international trade blocs: United States - Japan - Europe.
 Contradictions of the free market. The undecidable conflicts between protectionism and free trade.  The unstoppable flow of illegal drugs, arms, etc.
 Foreign debt. In effect the basis for mass starvation and demoralisation for developing countries.  Often the loans benefiting only a small elite, for luxury items, e.g., cars, air conditioning etc. but being paid back by poorer workers.
 The arms trade. The inability to control to any meaningful extent trade within the biggest ‘black market’
 Spread of nuclear weapons. The restriction of nuclear capacity can no longer be maintained by leading states since it is only knowledge and cannot be contained.
 Inter-ethnic wars. The phantom of mythic national identities fueling tension in semi-developed countries.
 Phantom-states within organised crime. In particular the non-democratic power gained by drug cartels.
 International law and its institutions. The hypocrisy of such statutes in the face of unilateral aggression on the part of the economically dominant states.  International law is mainly exercised against the weaker nations.

On the New International, Derrida has this to say:

See also
 Deconstruction
 Hauntology
Hauntology (music)
Post-Marxism

References

External links
What is Ideology?, excerpt from Spectres of Marx
Marcus Verhaeg Derrida's Specters of Marx and The Recognition of Pointless Identity

1993 non-fiction books
Books about Marxism
Works by Jacques Derrida
Hauntology